The 2023 Delta State gubernatorial election will take place on 18 March 2023, to elect the Governor of Delta State, concurrent with elections to the Delta State House of Assembly as well as twenty-seven other gubernatorial elections and elections to all other state houses of assembly. The election—which was postponed from its original 11 March date—will be held three weeks after the presidential election and National Assembly elections. Incumbent PDP Governor Ifeanyi Okowa is term-limited and cannot seek re-election to a third term.

Party primaries were scheduled for between 4 April and 9 June 2022 with the Peoples Democratic Party nominating Speaker of the House of Assembly Sheriff Oborevwori on 25 May while the All Progressives Congress nominated Senator for Delta Central Ovie Omo-Agege on 26 May. Although Oborevwori was initially disqualified by a Federal High Court on 7 July due to issues with his certificates, an Appeal Court overturned the ruling and reinstated Oborevwori on 29 August.

Electoral system
The Governor of Delta State is elected using a modified two-round system. To be elected in the first round, a candidate must receive the plurality of the vote and over 25% of the vote in at least two-thirds of state local government areas. If no candidate passes this threshold, a second round will be held between the top candidate and the next candidate to have received a plurality of votes in the highest number of local government areas.

Background
Delta State is a diverse state in the South South; although its oil reserves make it one of the most wealthy states in the nation, Delta has faced challenges in frequent oil spills, environmental degradation, and cult violence in large part due to years of systemic corruption.

Politically, the state's 2019 elections were categorized as a continuation of the PDP's control as Okowa won with over 80% of the vote and the party won a majority in the House of Assembly along with holding two senate seats. For the federal House, the PDP won back one seat lost from a defection but the seat of a different defector from the PDP went to the APC leaving the total results at 9 PDP, 1 APC. Although the state was easily won by PDP presidential nominee Atiku Abubakar, it still swung towards Buhari compared to 2015 and had much lower turnout.

In Okowa's May 2019 inauguration speech, he said that his second term focuses would include establishing nineteen new technical colleges, transport infrastructure, healthcare, entrepreneurship training programmes, and agriculture development. Performance-wise, Okowa was praised for increasing government transparency and improving infrastructure but was criticized for the controversial Delta Line privatization and his administration’s systemic budget misappropriation.

Primary elections
The primaries, along with any potential challenges to primary results, were to take place between 4 April and 3 June 2022 but the deadline was extended to 9 June. An informal zoning gentlemen's agreement sets the Delta Central Senatorial District to have the next governor as Delta Central has not held the governorship since 2007. However, groups from both the Delta North Senatorial District and Delta South Senatorial District claimed that as one full rotation of district would be complete in 2023, the next rotation could start from any district. Furthermore, Governor Ifeanyi Okowa claimed that there was no zoning agreement for the PDP while the Delta APC chastised the comments and committed to zoning their ticket to Delta Central. Nonetheless, both major parties ended up nominating natives of the Central district.

All Progressives Congress 
The year prior to the APC primaries were categorized by party infighting between Senator Ovie Omo-Agege and several other Delta APC politicians led by minister Festus Keyamo and Great Ogboru who accused Omo-Agege of hijacking the party to guarantee his victory in the 2023 gubernatorial primary. The two groups held separate parallel party congresses in late 2021 but as Omo-Agege is a high-ranking senator, his faction's congress was recognized as legitimate by the national party and he announced his gubernatorial candidacy in April 2022.

Ahead of the primary, Omo-Agege continuously reached out to aggrieved party members in an attempt to unify the party. On the primary date, Omo-Agege was the sole candidate and won the nomination unopposed. In his acceptance speech, Omo-Agege thanked his supporters and claimed that the state party reconciliation had succeeded. However, Ogboru left the party to become APGA's gubernatorial nominee, thus splitting the former state APC. About a month later, Omo-Agege picked Friday Osanebi as his running mate; Osanebi, a former House of Assembly member, was noted to be from the northern region and an ethnic Ndokwa, the group expected to get the deputy slot.

Nominated 
 Ovie Omo-Agege: Senator for Delta Central (2015–present) and Senate Deputy President (2019–present)
 Running mate—Friday Osanebi: former House of Assembly member for Ndokwa East

Withdrew 
 Micheal Ighofose

Declined 
 Jaro Egbo: lawyer

Results

People's Democratic Party 
Analysts viewed the PDP primary as a proxy battle between outgoing Governor Ifeanyi Okowa (who allegedly supported Assembly Speaker Sheriff Oborevwori) and former Governor James Ibori (who backed former finance commissioner David Edevbie). Another element of the race is zoning with the vast majority of candidates coming from Delta Central but two exceptions from Delta South.

Pre-primary analysis noted the previous political closeness of Okowa, Ibori, Oborevwori, and Edevbie before claiming that scandals revolving around Oborevwori credentials could hurt him. On the primary date, over a dozen candidates contested an indirect primary at the Stephen Keshi Stadium that ended with Oborevwori's victory with results showing him winning over 70% of the delegates' votes. Shortly before vote collation ended, Edevbie and Deputy Governor Kingsley Otuaro staged a walkout in protest of the proceedings. After the primary, observers initially asked if the party could unite in the wake of the contentious primaries but when Okowa was selected as the PDP vice presidential nominee, observers noted that he had taken effective control of the entire state party from ibori for the first time since 1999. On 23 June, Monday John Onyeme—the state Board of Internal Revenue Chairman—was announced as Oborevwori's running mate; Onyeme was noted to be from the northern region and an ethnic Ndokwa, the group expected to get the PDP deputy slot. However, while Oborevwori was beginning his general election campaign, Edevbie went to court for the annulment of the primary based on discrepancies in Oborevwori's submitted certificates; Oborevwori was disqualified on 7 July by a Federal High Court. The court ruling restarted the internal power struggle between Okowa and Obori as some party members feared that the infighting could led to the disqualification of the party. While the Oborevwori appeal was pushed to August by an Appeal Court sitting in Abuja, a different High Court division found the primary election to have been validly conducted in a lawsuit filed by a different unsuccessful candidate—Ikie Agbarianovwe. On 29 August, the Appeal Court ruled in favour of Oborevwori, reinstating him as the PDP nominee on the grounds that his opponents had not conclusively proven forgeries in his certificates. Edevbie immediately initiated an appeal to the Supreme Court with Chief Justice Olukayode Ariwoola appointing a panel led by Justice Amina Augie to hear the case. On 21 October—the day of the verdict, a violent crowd of PDP supporters forced their way into the courtroom; after it was cleared, the panel's unanimous verdict in favour of Oborevwori was announced in which the court held that Oborevwori was the valid PDP nominee for governor. Both Okowa and Oborevwori publicly celebrated the verdict as a victory for internal democratic practices while the state PDP released a statement calling for unity.

Nominated 
 Sheriff Oborevwori: House of Assembly member for Okpe (2015–present) and Speaker of the House of Assembly (2017–present)
Running mate—Monday John Onyeme: Chairman of the Delta State Board of Internal Revenue

Eliminated in primary 
 Ikie Agbarianovwe
 Braduce Angozi: former Commissioner for Agriculture
 David Edevbie: former Commissioner for Finance, former Chief of Staff to Governor Ifeanyi Okowa, 2015 PDP gubernatorial candidate, and former Principal Secretary to President Umaru Musa Yar'Adua
 Abel Esievo: former Delta State Auditor General for Local Government
 Lucky Idike: economist
 Chris Iyovwaye: businessman
 Fred Majemite: former Commissioner and husband of former Ethiope West Local Government Chairwoman Faith Majemite
 James Manager: Senator for Delta South (2003–present), former Chairman of the Delta State PDP (1998–1999), former Commissioner for Sports, and former Commissioner for Works
 Peter Mrakpor: former state Attorney General and Commissioner for Justice and ex-husband of former House of Representatives member for Aniocha North/Aniocha South/Oshimili North/Oshimili South Joan Onyemaechi Mrakpor
 Ejaife Odebala: former aide to Governor Ifeanyi Okowa, former House of Assembly member for Sapele, and former Sapele Local Government Chairman
 Bright Edejeghwro Onajefe-Gift
 Kingsley Otuaro: Deputy Governor (2015–present)

Withdrew 
Emmanuel Aguariavwodo: former Senator for Delta Central (2013–2015) and former House of Representatives member
 James Augoye: former Commissioner for Works (2015–2019) and former Okpe Local Government Caretaker Chairman (2012–2014)
 Kenneth Gbagi: 2015 PDP gubernatorial candidate and former Minister of State for Education (defected prior to the primary to successfully run in the SDP gubernatorial primary)
 Ediri Idimi: engineer
Efe Ofobruku: former aide to Governor Ifeanyi Okowa and former House of Assembly member for Uvwie

Results

Minor parties 

 Helen Agboola Onokiti (Accord)
Running mate: Iweanya David Okolie
 Jenkins Duvie Gwede (Action Alliance)
Running mate: Timis Tonbra Okonma
 Emmanuel Samuel Ogba (Action Democratic Party)
Running mate: Gift Valentina Okeh
 Annabel Cosmas (Action Peoples Party)
Running mate: Udoka Francis
 Efeoghene Shedrack Ekure (African Democratic Congress)
Running mate: Happiness Okoro
 Ekene Eze (Allied Peoples Movement)
Running mate: Oghenefegor Patrick Upama
 Great Ogboru (All Progressives Grand Alliance)
Running mate: Chinedu Sydney Allanah
 Sylvester Umudjane (Boot Party)
Running mate: Dorcas Ekpe
 Kennedy Kawhariebie Pela (Labour Party)
Running mate: Julie Nwabogo Efemena Umukoro
 Goodnews Agbi (New Nigeria Peoples Party)
Running mate: Bolaji Anthony Alabi
 Emmanuel America (National Rescue Movement)
Running mate: Blessing Tochi Njoagwuani
 Immanuel Edijala (People's Redemption Party)
Running mate: Glory Ndidi Umerah
 Kenneth Gbagi (Social Democratic Party)
Running mate: Ishoma Rosemary Oshilim
 Sunny Ofehe (Young Progressives Party)
Running mate: Eloho Chalele
 Emmanuel Okoh (Zenith Labour Party)
Running mate: Eziunor Onyefudsaonu

Campaign
After the primaries in June 2022, observers stated that then-PDP nominee Sheriff Oborevwori focused on unifying the state PDP while the APC began general election preparations. Analysts also noted two notable minor party nominees—longtime politician Great Ogboru (APGA) and former Minister Kenneth Gbagi (SDP)—while also writing about the power shift as all prominent candidates were from the central district. By late June and July, both major parties' focus had shifted to the search for a deputy gubernatorial nominee as regional and ethnic balance was considered; as both Omo-Agege and Oborevwori are ethnic Urhobos from the central district, they looked towards the northern district for a running mate. As the Ndokwa people had never produced a governor or deputy governor, both Omo-Agege and Oborevwori picked a running mate from the ethnic group—Friday Osanebi and Monday John Onyeme, respectively.

Despite attempts at PDP reconciliation, a lawsuit challenging Oborevwori's candidacy by runner-up David Edevbie was not withdrawn and emerged successful on 7 July. The court ruling disqualified Oborevwori for discrepancies in his certificates and ordered the PDP to conduct a new primary. Oborevwori immediately appealed the decision and the PDP insisted that he was the party nominee but INEC omitted his name from the list of recognized nominees later in July. Although Oborevwori was reinstated as nominee by an Appeal Court ruling in late August, the month was dominated by PDP infighting and observer questions over the party's electoral strength. Coupled with the previous infighting was the shadow of Edevbie's appeal to the Supreme Court, which reporters said signified the continuation of the PDP crisis. When the official campaign period began in early October, analysis focused on various candidates while noting that the PDP had not resolved its crisis. The PDP dispute was finally concluded in mid-October as the Supreme Court ruled in favour of Oborevwori, affirming him as the valid PDP nominee.

At the end of October, negative campaigning escalated as Omo-Agege labeled Oborevwori as simply a proxy of Okowa while Oborevwori derided the APC as non-performing. By the next month, the jabs had intensified further with Omo-Agege accusing Oborevwori of running the House of Assembly as a rubber stamp for Okowa while Oborevwori responded by labeling the Senate as a rubber stamp for Buhari. The attacks were in the wider context of internal party rifts within both the APC and PDP as there were notably absences from campaign events by the intraparty rivals of Omo-Agege and Oborevwori. As campaigning continued into the new year, pundits noted the seeming disinterest in campaigning from the Edevbie-aligned camp within the PDP along with waves of defections from several parties in January 2023. Other observers noted the renewed political salience of ethnic identity politics. By February, analysts reviewed the chances of each candidate, noting that no minor party nominee seemed to have gained a foothold or have a chance of victory. Premium Times analysis labeled the race as a tossup between Oborevwori and Omo-Agege; noting the outcome of the presidential election and the moves of James Ibori as two key unknown factors before Election Day.

Later in February, focus switched to the presidential election on 25 February. In the election, Delta State voted for Peter Obi (LP); Obi won the state with 55.6% of the vote, beating Atiku Abubakar (PDP) at 26.3% and Bola Tinubu (APC) at 14.7%. Considered a slight surprise—considering Okowa was Abubakar's running mate—the result led to increased focus on the gubernatorial race. Additionally, the presidential result pushed journalists to label Ken Pela (LP) as a major candidate due to Obi's win.

Projections

Conduct

Electoral timetable

General election

Results

By senatorial district 
The results of the election by senatorial district.

By federal constituency
The results of the election by federal constituency.

By local government area 
The results of the election by local government area.

See also 
 2023 Nigerian elections
 2023 Nigerian gubernatorial elections

Notes

References 

Delta State gubernatorial election
2023
2023 Delta State elections
Delta